The National Basketball League (NBL) (in Bulgarian: Националната баскетболна лига) is the highest professional basketball league in Bulgaria. The current league was founded in 2008, though the first-tier level existed since 1942 and was previously called the Bulgarian A Division. The games in the NBL are played under FIBA rules. The most successful team in NBL history is PBC Academic, which has won 26 national titles.

Current teams

Title holders

 1942 Levski Sofia
 1943 JSK Sofia
 1945 PSK Levski '45
 1946 PSK Levski '45
 1947 PSK Levski '45
 1947–48 Lokomotiv Sofia
 1948–49 CDNV Sofia
 1949–50 Narodna voiska Sofia
 1950–51 CDNV Sofia
 1951–52 Udarnik Sofia
 1952–53 Udarnik Sofia
 1953–54 Spartak Sofia
 1954–55 Lokomotiv Sofia
 1955–56 Spartak Sofia
 1956–57 Academic
 1957–58 Academic
 1958–59 Academic
 1959–60 Spartak Sofia
 1960–61 Lokomotiv Sofia
 1961–62 Spartak Sofia
 1962–63 Academic
 1963–64 Lokomotiv Sofia
 1964–65 CSKA Cherveno zname
 1965–66 Lokomotiv Sofia
 1966–67 CSKA Cherveno zname
 1967–68 Academic
 1968–69 Academic
 1969–70 Academic
 1970–71 Academic
 1971–72 Academic
 1972–73 Academic
 1973–74 Balkan Botevgrad
 1974–75 Academic
 1975–76 Academic
 1976–77 CSKA Septemvriisko zname
 1977–78 Levski-Spartak
 1978–79 Levski-Spartak
 1979–80 CSKA Sofia
 1980–81 Levski-Spartak
 1981–82 Levski-Spartak
 1982–83 CSKA Sofia
 1983–84 CSKA Sofia
 1984–85 Akademik Varna
 1985–86 Levski-Spartak
 1986–87 Balkan Botevgrad
 1987–88 Balkan Botevgrad
 1988–89 Balkan Botevgrad
 1989–90 CSKA Sofia
 1990–91 CSKA Sofia
 1991–92 CSKA Sofia
 1992–93 Levski Sofia
 1993–94 Levski Sofia
 1994–95 Spartak Pleven
 1995–96 Spartak Pleven
 1996–97 Slavia Sofia
 1997–98 Cherno More Varna
 1998–99 Cherno More Varna
 1999–00 Levski Sofia
 2000–01 Levski Sofia
 2001–02 Yambolgas
 2002–03 Lukoil Academic
 2003–04 Lukoil Academic
 2004–05 Lukoil Academic
 2005–06 Lukoil Academic
 2006–07 Lukoil Academic
 2007–08 Lukoil Academic
 2008–09 Lukoil Academic
 2009–10 Lukoil Academic
 2010–11 Lukoil Academic
 2011–12 Lukoil Academic
 2012–13 Lukoil Academic
 2013–14 Levski Sofia
 2014–15 Lukoil Academic
 2015–16 Lukoil Academic
 2016–17 Lukoil Academic
 2017–18 Levski Sofia
 2018–19 Balkan Botevgrad
 2019-20 Abandoned
 2020-21 Levski Sofia
 2021–22 Balkan Botevgrad

Titles by Club

Latest finals

References

External links
bgbasket.com
Official Website
Eurobasket.com League Page

 
Basketball leagues in Bulgaria
Bulgaria
Sports leagues established in 1942
1942 establishments in Bulgaria
Professional sports leagues in Bulgaria